Edward Layton was an English footballer who played as a left and right full back for Sheffield United, South Kirkby, Aston Villa, Middlesbrough and Cardiff City.

Playing career
Layton began his football career at Royston United in the Barnsley Junior and Sheffield Association leagues, before moving to Sheffield United, where he helped the reserves to the Midland League title. Injury in the 1903/04 season meant he missed much of the season and he eventually left to join South Kirkby, where he became club captain. He later moved to Rotherham Town before being signed by Aston Villa in January 1908, moving next to Middlesbrough. In 1912 he left Middlesbrough for Australia, along with his brother William. In 1914 he returned to England, where he had been playing football for two years, with Middlesbrough still holding his registration. Cardiff City eventually acquired his registration and later he joined Stockport County.

International career
Between 1912 and 1914 Layton travelled across Australia, playing football for various small clubs. During this time he was 'capped' by Australia in a match between New South Wales and Queensland. Even though his normal position was full back he played the game as centre forward, scoring the only goal.

Family
Edward was the brother of William Layton, a footballer with Sheffield Wednesday.

References

Date of birth missing
Date of death missing
English footballers
Association football defenders
English Football League players
South Kirkby Colliery F.C. players
Sheffield United F.C. players
Aston Villa F.C. players
Middlesbrough F.C. players
Cardiff City F.C. players
Southern Football League players
1883 births